Bonavista State Park Golf Course is a  state park and golf course located in the Town of Ovid, just west of the Village of Ovid, New York, United States. The park is located between Sampson State Park and Seneca Lake State Park and overlooks Seneca Lake.

Park description
Bonavista State Park's property was once farmland, and was farmed by residents of the Willard Asylum for the Chronic Insane. The golf course contains apple and pear trees that remain from the farm's orchard.

The park features a nine-hole golf course, which can allow for an 18-hole round by playing each hole from different tees. The park also includes a clubhouse, restaurant, picnic areas, and a snack bar.

See also
 List of New York state parks

References

External links
 New York State Parks: Bonavista State Park Golf Course

State parks of New York (state)
Golf clubs and courses in New York (state)
Parks in Seneca County, New York